Hvelreki is the sixth studio album of Ozark Henry, released in October 2010. It is the first Ozark Henry album for EMI Music. Hvelreki is an Icelandic phrase that means 'good luck' and literally translates as: 'May a whole whale wash up on your beach.'

The album was preceded by the single "This One's For You", which was released on 10 September 2010. The album also features "Godspeed", a previously released single (which was also on the compilation album A Decade). The version of "Godspeed" on this album is prolonged when compared to the single. A live version of "Godspeed" was also released on the live album Grace.

Track listing
All songs written by Ozark Henry

Charts

Weekly charts

Year-end charts

Certifications

References

Ozark Henry albums
2010 albums